Hardiness may refer to:

Hardiness (plants), the ability of plants to survive adverse growing conditions
Hardiness zone, area in which a category of plants is capable of growing, as defined by the minimum temperature of that area
Psychological resilience or mental resilience, positive capacity of people to cope with stress and catastrophe
Hardiness (psychology), a conceptual framework for psychological resilience